The Education Act 1994 is an act passed by the Parliament of the United Kingdom under John Major's government in 1994, which primarily established the Teacher Training Agency and allowed students to opt out of students' unions.

Part I

Part I relates to teacher training and includes the establishment of the Teacher Training Agency.

Part II
Part II of the Education Act gave effect to students' freedom of association by mandating that students must be permitted to opt out of any students' union without being unfairly disadvantaged; this provision replaced am earlier proposal that would have made membership voluntary (i.e. opt-in), which had been seen to have a significant impact on membership of students' unions in Australia and was expected to have a similar impact in the UK. This Part also places further restrictions on Students' Unions by requiring that affiliation to external organizations must be voted on at referendum if 5% of the membership requests a referendum and restricts the time a sabbatical officer can serve to two years. It also stipulates that a students' union must be governed democratically and must be accountable for its finances.

There are various other clauses about the finances and external affiliations of students' unions.

Section 22 of the Act requires that "the procedure for allocating resources to groups or clubs should be fair and should be set down in writing and freely accessible to all students". This has generated some controversy because of the way it can be interpreted. Some assert that it requires all university societies that draw on students' union funding to be open to membership by all students, whilst others assert that this does not explicitly prevent a society of a students' union from restricting its membership to those who share the aims and purposes of the society.

References

External links
Text of the 1994 Education Act from HMSO
 BBC news - Ban for exclusive Christian body

United Kingdom Acts of Parliament 1994
Students' unions in the United Kingdom
United Kingdom Education Acts
1994 in education